Major General Nicholas Henry Eeles  (born 24 April 1961) is a British Army officer who served as General Officer Commanding Scotland.

Military career
Educated at the University of Bristol, Eeles was commissioned into the Royal Artillery in 1982. In 1994 he was deployed to Bosnia as Chief of Staff in the British headquarters of United Nations Protection Force. He then commanded C Battery Royal Horse Artillery in which role he was deployed to Northern Ireland. He was appointed Commanding Officer of 26 Regiment RA in 2001 and commanded his regiment in Germany, Kosovo and Bosnia before preparing in for operations in Iraq. He went on to be Commander Royal Artillery of 3rd Division in April 2005, Brigadier on the general staff in the Ministry of Defence in June 2007 and Director Royal Artillery in January 2010.

He was appointed General Officer Commanding 2nd Infantry Division and Governor of Edinburgh Castle on 4 January 2012 and, following the disbanding of 2nd Infantry Division on 1 April 2012, he became General Officer Commanding Scotland on 2 April 2012.

Eeles was appointed Commander of the Order of the British Empire (CBE) in the 2014 New Year Honours.

References

1961 births
Living people
Alumni of the University of Bristol
British Army major generals
Royal Artillery officers
British Army personnel of the Iraq War
Commanders of the Order of the British Empire